Gaillard de Durfort or Galhart de Durfort may refer to:

Gaillard I de Durfort (died 1356/7), former priest
Gaillard II de Durfort (died 1422), son of preceding, seneschal of Gascony
Gaillard III de Durfort (died 1452), son of preceding, seneschal of Landes
Gaillard IV de Durfort (died 1482)